Ram Chiang Chi-kwong (born 2 July 1961), is a Hong Kong actor and former singer-composer, currently under Television Broadcasts Limited (TVB) management. A versatile actor who is most recognized for his many supporting roles in TVB dramas, Chiang was awarded the "TVB Professional Actor Award" in 2014 for his many years as a dedicated TVB employee. He also won the TVB Anniversary Award for Best Supporting Actor with his role in the 2014 drama Come On, Cousin.

Career
Ram Chiang started out singing cover songs of other artistes before he was invited by George Lam, one of the singers he imitated, to perform alongside him on stage in 1985. During the concert, George Lam gave him the English name "Ram" as opposed to George's "Lam", since "L" and "R" together make stereo sound. After this, Chiang was signed to Polydor Records in 1985. He became well known for performing classic 90s Hong Kong pop songs such as "You Needn’t Be Acquaintances to Meet with Each Other" (相逢何必曾相識, a duet with Rita Carpio), and "Queen's Road East" (皇后大道東, a collaboration with Lo Ta-yu).

After becoming disenchanted with the Hong Kong music industry, Chiang decided to quit being a singer in the early 1990s and signed with TVB to become an actor. He mostly played supporting roles. In 2014, his popularity skyrocketed when Wong Cho-lam wrote a role tailor-made for Chiang when he was cast as Ko Yam (高音), a talented washed up musician with a tragic past in the comedy Come On, Cousin. The role won him the "2014 Best Supporting Actor" award at TVB's annual anniversary awards and saw a resurgence in his singing career.

Personal life
Chiang is married and has a son. He is a private person and does not talk about his family much.

Being a devout Christian, Chiang does not attend the blessing ceremonies of any projects he works on, as ceremonies involve Taoist and Chinese folk rituals. It is an industry standard in Hong Kong for the filming cast and crew to offer incense to the gods to ask for their blessings of safety and smooth production during filming.

Discography
拯救行動 (1987) — EP
Meeting/Going (相逢/走; 1990) — Cantonese album
相逢何必曾相識-未來的語言 (1990) — Mandarin album
Cheung Chi Kwong and his Friends (蔣志光與他的朋友; 1992) — Cantonese album
Passage to Music (創作路; 1993) — Cantonese album
 多情多寂寞 (1993) — Mandarin album
 Legendary Voices (傳奇巨聲, 2014) — Compilation album with Rita Carpio

Filmography

Television dramas

Films

References

External links

Living people
TVB actors
20th-century Hong Kong male actors
21st-century Hong Kong male actors
Hong Kong male film actors
1961 births
Hong Kong male singers
Hong Kong singer-songwriters
Hong Kong Christians